Tropical Storm Agatha was a weak but deadly tropical cyclone that brought widespread floods to much of Central America, and was the deadliest tropical cyclone in the eastern Pacific since Hurricane Pauline in 1997. The first storm of the 2010 Pacific hurricane season, Agatha originated from the Intertropical Convergence Zone, a region of thunderstorms across the tropics. It developed into a tropical depression on May 29 and tropical storm later, it was dissipated on May 30, reaching top winds of 45 mph ( and a lowest pressure of 1000 mbar (hPa; 29.53 inHg). It made landfall near the Guatemala–Mexico border on the evening of May 29. Agatha produced torrential rain all across Central America, which resulted in the death of one person in Nicaragua. In Guatemala, 152 people were killed and 100 left missing by landslides. Thirteen deaths also occurred in El Salvador. Agatha soon dissipated over Guatemala. As of June 15, officials in Guatemala have stated that 165 people were killed and 113 others are missing.

In all, Agatha caused at least 204 fatalities, and roughly $1.1 billion in damage throughout Central America. Despite the catastrophic damage in Mexico, along with a high fatality rate, Agatha was not retired, and therefore was used again in the 2016 season.

Meteorological history

Tropical Storm Agatha originated from an area of convection, or thunderstorms, that developed on May 24, off the west coast on Costa Ricaam. At the time, there was a trough in the region that extended into the southwestern Caribbean Sea, associated with the Intertropical Convergence Zone. The system drifted northwestward, and conditions favored further development. On May 25, the convection became more concentrated, and the National Hurricane Center (NHC) noted the potential for a tropical depression to develop. The next day, it briefly became disorganized, as its circulation was broad and elongated; however, the disturbance was in a very moist environment, and multiple low level centers gradually organized into one. The low continued to get better organized; however, there was a lack of a well-defined circulation. On May 29, after further organization of the circulation and convection, the NHC initiated advisories on Tropical Depression One-E while the system was located about 295 miles (475 km) west of San Salvador, El Salvador.

Upon becoming a tropical cyclone, the system was located in an environment with little wind shear and waters of 30 °C (86 °F). As such, it was expected to strengthen, although the mountainous terrain of the Central American coastline limited significant intensification. The depression moved slowly northeastward around the western periphery of a ridge located over northern South America. Several hours later, satellites monitoring the system discovered tropical storm-force winds, prompting the NHC to upgrade the depression to Tropical Storm Agatha. Around this time, it was noted that there was a 40% chance of the system undergoing rapid intensification within the following 24 hours as the only limiting factor was its proximity to land. However, the storm failed to intensify much, peaking in intensity with winds of 45 mph (75 km/h) and a barometric pressure of 1001 mbar (hPa; 29.56 inHg). Within two hours of reaching this strength, Agatha abruptly relocated northward and made landfall at 22:30 UTC near Champerico, Guatemala.

After landfall, Agatha continued to cause floods and landslides, however it did not bring a lot of tropical storm force winds on shore. A burst of convection re-emerged east of Belize, in the Atlantic basin, on May 31. On June 1, the National Hurricane Center stated that the remnants of Tropical Storm Agatha had only a low chance of regeneration in the western Caribbean Sea.

Preparations
Upon the formation of Tropical Depression One-E on May 29, the Government of Guatemala declared a tropical storm warning for the entire Pacific coastline. Due to the system's proximity to land, tropical storm force winds were expected to reach the coast by the evening hours, making outdoor preparations difficult. Additionally, the depression's slow movement was expected to lead to enormous rainfall totals, exceeding  in some areas. This rain was expected to produce large-scale, life-threatening flash flooding and landslides across Guatemala, El Salvador and southeastern Mexico. Once the system intensified into Tropical Storm Agatha, the National Hurricane Center expected areas to the south and east of the landfall location to experience storm surge along with destructive waves. By the late morning of May 29, Guatemalan officials placed all hospitals on high alert and declared a state of calamity. President Álvaro Colom also began to use some of the $85 million allocated as emergency funds by the World Bank. After the storm moved over land and weakened to a tropical depression, the tropical storm warnings along the coast were discontinued.

Throughout El Salvador and Nicaragua, emergency officials evacuated about 2,000 residents due to the threat of flash flooding. In response to the approaching storm, a yellow alert was declared for all of El Salvador and it was estimated that roughly 89% of the country was at risk from flooding. Roughly 52,000 police, emergency rescue personnel and soldiers were placed on standby by the Dirección General de Protección Civil.

Impact

Nicaragua
Prior to becoming a tropical depression, the system produced torrential rainfall in Nicaragua, resulting in the death of one person after she was swept away by a swollen river. Many homes and bridges were destroyed across the country. In  Estelí Department, the Nicaraguan Air Force had to rescue 24 people trapped in their homes.

Guatemala

Excessive rainfall from Agatha in the region could exacerbate the situation and trigger lahars. However, people working in coffee fields considered the rain brought by the storm to be helpful, removing ash from their trees. According to meteorologists in Guatemala, at least  of rain had fallen by the evening of May 29. Several landslides blocked roadways across southern areas of the country, hindering traffic. Following the storm, a three-story building was swallowed by a 30-meter (100-ft) diameter sinkhole caused by Agatha's rainfall.

A mudslide coming down the Agua volcano left 9 deaths and 12 disappeared in the town of San Miguel Escobar. 
In the town of Almolonga, department of Quetzaltenango, a mudslide triggered by the storm killed four people after destroying their home, and in total twelve people were killed in Guatemala, while another landslide left 11 people missing.
 
Officials in the country declared a state of emergency during the afternoon of May 29 as conditions worsened. Many rivers in the country were already swollen and close to over-topping their banks. Many other homes were destroyed in widespread floods and dozens of emergency rescues had to be made.

By the afternoon of May 30, reports from the region stated that 15 people had been killed and 22 others were missing throughout Guatemala. Preliminary damage assessments showed that at least 3,500 homes were damaged. A total of 112,000 people were evacuated. Additionally, at least 20,000 people have been left homeless as a result of the storm. This also ranks Agatha as the wettest known tropical cyclone to ever strike the country, surpassing Hurricane Mitch. By the next day, the death toll had risen to 92, with another 95 people injured.

In Guatemala City, a sinkhole 30 stories deep collapsed, killing 15 people and placing a further 300 residents in danger. A three-story house and telephone poles were also swallowed, along with a security guard. The sinkhole was formed due to sewage pipes leaking, and flooding from Agatha only exacerbated the problem.

Mexico

At least 120 families were evacuated from southeastern Chiapas, near where the storm made landfall. A yellow alert was also declared for the state as significant flooding was anticipated.

Honduras
After moving inland over Guatemala and Mexico, torrential rains from the remnants of Agatha triggered flash flooding and landslides in parts of Honduras. At least 45 homes have been destroyed and one person was killed in the country. On May 31, the presidents of both El Salvador and Honduras declared a state of emergency for their respective countries.

El Salvador
In El Salvador, widespread flooding took place as heavy rains fell across the country. Throughout San Salvador and five other cities threatened by flooding, emergency officials urged residents to evacuate to shelters. A total of 140 landslides occurred. The highest known rainfall total in the country was 400 mm (15.7 in); however, further rains have fallen since this total was reported. A total of six people were killed in the country. At least two other people are reported missing in the country. By May 30, President Mauricio Funes declared a country-wide state of emergency due to the widespread damage caused by Agatha. According to the Office for the Coordination of Humanitarian Affairs, a total of 12 people were killed by Agatha throughout El Salvador and roughly 120,000 individuals were affected across 116 municipalities. At one point, more than 15,000 people were housed in emergency shelters; however, by June 9, this number decreased to just 712. Unlike Guatemala which suffered extreme damage in its educational sector, most schools in El Salvador were functional after the storm's passage. Of the 378 schools affected, 63 sustained severe damage. Overall, Agatha wrought $31.1 million in damage across El Salvador.

Aftermath
Immediately following reports of fatalities in Guatemala, a state of emergency was declared for the entire country. Later on, President Álvaro Colom stated that, "We believe Agatha could wreak more damage in the country than Hurricane Mitch and Hurricane Stan". These storms were two of the most devastating tropical cyclones to impact the country, killing 384 and 1,513 people respectively. On May 31, national aid started to be deployed by the government and donation centers for victims of the storm were opened across the country. According to the Office for the Coordination of Humanitarian Affairs (OCHA), schools in Guatemala were to be closed until at least June 4. However, due to the large number of severely damaged or destroyed schools, few buildings can actually allow for classes to take place and 144 of the schools that are intact are being used as shelters.

By June 1, the Government of Guatemala sent an appeal to the United Nations for roughly $100 million in international assistance to deal with damage wrought by Agatha. On June 14, President Colom stated that it would take at least five years to recover from Tropical Storm Agatha due to the widespread nature of the catastrophe. To obtain the necessary resources to recover from the storm, Colom implemented a substantial tax increase. His goal was to increase the revenue from taxes in the country to 9.8% of the gross domestic product.

Throughout the country, roughly 392,600 people were left in need of humanitarian assistance in the wake of Agatha. Most of these people live in rural areas which became isolated from surrounding areas after flood waters washed out roads and destroyed bridges.

International assistance

As Agatha dissipated over Guatemala, the Government of Mexico expressed their sincere condolences to the two countries and offered to provide the necessary support for them to recover. During the afternoon of May 30, as the true scale of the disaster became apparent, Álvaro Colom requested international assistance. However, due to the eruption of Pacaya, the country's international airport was closed and would remain so for at least another week. In an agreement with the president of El Salvador, it was decided that aid would be flown into El Salvador and transported by ground to Guatemala. However, later reports revealed that two of the four land crossings between the countries were closed off due to flooding and landslides. On May 31, Colombia and the United States offered their assistance by sending aid or helping evacuate residents. By the late morning, six United States military aircraft were en route to Honduras. The Ministry of Foreign Affairs in Taiwan also stated that they would provide aid to Guatemala if necessary.

The Government of France also passed on their condolences to the countries suffering from the disaster and pledged to send emergency humanitarian aid to the region. This was eventually followed up by June 14 when the French embassy in Guatemala provided $50,000 in relief supplies. The initial response from the World Food Programme was to allocate $500,000 to feed 10,000 over a period of 15 days. Other United Nations departments provided much assistance to Guatemala within two days of Agatha's landfall. UNICEF donated roughly $50,000 to support water and sanitation; UNDP allocated $50,000 for assessments and early recovery; the Spanish Agency for International Cooperation for Development provided roughly $185,000 in general humanitarian aid; and the IFRC and UNFPA planned donate $50,000 each. The United States provided immediate funds of GTQ 900,000 (US$112,000); USAID also planned to deploy relief teams with food and emergency supplies to bring to those affected by the storm. Additionally, several helicopters from the United States Southern Command were to be deployed in the region.

By June 1, the European Union had sent $3.7 million in aid to Guatemala as well as Honduras and El Salvador. The Save the Children organization began distributing hygiene kits and other relief supplies on June 4. Over the following weeks, they planned to provide 46 metric tons of supplies.

Extensive losses of the country's food supply left tens of thousands of residents without sustenance, leading to fears of widespread hunger in the nation. In attempts to lessen the severity of the hunger outbreak, the WFP set up over 200 shelters across the country and was estimated to be serving 50,000 people a day by June 9. On June 11, the United Nations made an appeal to supply Guatemala with $14.5 million to aid survivors of the storm. This appeal followed a $34 million request for the country prior to the storm for malnutrition incidents. By June 14, the Government of Japan had provided roughly $220,000 worth of equipment and building materials. Around the same time, ACT Development announced that it planned to assist roughly 2,000 families with all basic life necessities for a month. To start this operation, a preliminary appeal was made to the United Nations for $881,000; a second, full appeal was planned to be published on June 20.

See also

 Tropical Storm Hermine (2010)
 List of Pacific hurricanes
 2010 Pacific hurricane season

References

External links

The National Hurricane Center's Advisory Archive for Tropical Storm Agatha

Agatha
Agatha 2010
Agatha 2010
Agatha 2010
Agatha 2010
Agatha 2010
Tropical Storm Agatha
Tropical Storm Agatha
Tropical Storm Agatha
Tropical Storm Agatha
Tropical Storm Agatha
Agatha